Monochroa dellabeffai is a moth of the family Gelechiidae. It was described by Hans Rebel in 1932. It is found in France and Italy.

The wingspan is 15–16 mm. The forewings are deep blackish brown with yellow markings. The hindwings are dark grey.

References

Moths described in 1932
Monochroa